Harold Lee Lewis (born September 22, 1935) is a former American football halfback who played for the Baltimore Colts, Buffalo Bills and Oakland Raiders. He played college football at the University of Houston, having previously attended Pampa High School.

References

1935 births
Living people
Players of American football from Houston
American football fullbacks
Houston Cougars football players
Baltimore Colts players
Buffalo Bills (AAFC) players
Oakland Raiders players
American Football League players
Buffalo Bills players